Jean-Paul Fleri Soler (born 5 June 1964) is a Maltese windsurfer. He competed in the 1988 Summer Olympics and the 1992 Summer Olympics.

References

External links
 
 

1964 births
Living people
Maltese windsurfers
Maltese male sailors (sport)
Olympic sailors of Malta
Sailors at the 1988 Summer Olympics – Division II
Sailors at the 1992 Summer Olympics – Lechner A-390